Julius Pollux (Ioulios Polydeukes; fl. 2nd century) was a Greek scholar and rhetorician from Naucratis, Ancient Egypt.
Emperor Commodus appointed him a professor-chair of rhetoric in Athens at the Academy — on account of his melodious voice, according to Philostratus' Lives of the Sophists.

Works 
Pollux was the author of the Onomasticon, a Greek thesaurus or dictionary of Attic synonyms and phrases, in ten books, each prefaced with a dedication to the emperor Commodus. The work forms part of the Atticist movement of the Second Sophistic, and was intended to provide a full catalogue of the Greek vocabulary derived from classical texts that an accomplished orator could deploy. Within this movement, Pollux shows himself "a liberal and inclusive Atticist," willing to admit vocabulary from classical authors in non-Attic dialects (like Herodotus), from post-classical works (such as New Comedy and Hellenistic historiography), and from contemporary spoken Greek. The entries in the work are arranged not alphabetically but according to subject-matter. Pollux claims that the exact order of subjects is random, but contemporary scholarship has discerned organisational patterns based on "the paradigmatic relationships at the heart of Romano-Greek society." For example, Book 5 is divided into two halves, the first of which deals with words relating to hunting and the second half of which Pollux calls "eclectic" (e.g. the entries in 5.148-5.152 are: proischesthai "to hold forth", grammata en stelais "writing on steles", diakores "satiated", anamphibolon "unambiguous"), but, within this eclecticism, Zadorojnyi nevertheless notes a tendency to focus on binary oppositions like love and hate, praise and denunaciation. 

It supplies much rare and valuable information on many points of classical antiquity — objects in daily life, the theater, politics – and quotes numerous fragments of lost works. Thus, Julius Pollux became invaluable for William Smith's Dictionary of Greek and Roman Antiquities, 1842, etc.

Nothing of his rhetorical works has survived, except some of their titles (in the Suda).

Contemporary reception 
Pollux was probably the person satirized by Lucian as a worthless and ignorant person who gains a reputation as an orator by sheer effrontery, and pilloried in his Lexiphanes, a satire upon the affectation of obscure and obsolete words.

Editions 
 1502, ed. by Aldus Manutius in Venice. Re-edited at 1520 by Lucantonio Giunta and at 1536 by Simon Grynaeus in Basel.
 1900–1967, ed. E. Bethe, Leipzig (Teubner). Volume 1, Volume 2, Volume 3.

Translations 
A Latin translation made by Rudolf Gwalther was published in Basel at 1541 and made Julius Pollux more available to Renaissance antiquaries and scholars, and anatomists, who adopted obscure Greek words for parts of the body.

References

Bibliography
This article is based in part on material from the 1999 Encyclopædia Britannica.

 Cinzia Bearzot, Franca Landucci, Giuseppe Zecchini (ed.), L'Onomasticon di Giulio Polluce. Tra lessicografia e antiquaria. Milano: Vita e Pensiero, 2007. Pp. viii, 173 (Contributi di storia antica, 5)

External links
Onomasticon cum annotationibus interpretum, Wilhelm Dindorf (ed.), 3 voll., Lipsiae in libraria kuehniana, 1824.

2nd-century writers
2nd-century Romans
2nd-century Egyptian people
Lexicographers
Theatre theorists
Year of death unknown
Year of birth unknown
Pollux